Lance Gentile is an American doctor, and television technical advisor, writer and producer.

Career
Gentile graduated with a BA degree in psychology from Cornell University in Ithaca, New York. He was a medical student at New York Medical College and completed his residency in the emergency department at Maine Medical Center in Portland, Maine where he would misdiagnose a 20 year old hypothyroid patient with "probable latent schizophrenia". He later moved to Los Angeles, and practiced emergency medicine at several community hospitals, including the San Dimas Community Hospital and the Santa Monica Hospital Medical Center. In 1986, Gentile entered the MFA program at USC Film School. He wrote and directed STAT, an autobiographical film about his life in a hospital emergency department. The film received many awards, including the Cine Colden Eagle and Nissan Focus Awards for best documentary. He graduated in 1990 and went on to direct music videos and documentaries before working in television.

Gentile began working in television as a technical advisor because of his experience as a medical professional. He wrote, co-produced and served as the technical advisor for a television movie called State of Emergency. Gentile was nominated for a Humanitas Prize in 1994 for his work on State of Emergency. This led to technical advisor positions on another television movie named Donor and on Wes Craven's film New Nightmare.

Gentile was technical advisor for the pilot episode of ER and had a cameo in the episode. He became technical advisor for the first season of and wrote several episodes. He was made medical consultant before the end of the season. Gentile's episode "Love's Labor Lost" won him an Emmy Award for Outstanding Writing for a Drama Series at the 1995 ceremony. Gentile also won a Writers Guild of America Award for his work on the episode.

Gentile became a story editor for the second season of ER and continued to write episodes and serve as medical consultant. He was promoted to executive story editor mid-season. Gentile made his television directing debut with a second-season episode of ER. Gentile became a co-producer on the third season and retained his writing and medical consultant responsibilities. The third season of ER was nominated for an Emmy Award for Outstanding Drama Series at the 1997 awards. The producers shared the nomination for their work on the season. Gentile was promoted to producer for the fourth season and continued to write and direct episodes and serve as the season's medical consultant. The season was again nominated for the Emmy Award for Outstanding Drama Series at the 1998 awards and Gentile shared the nomination for a second time.

Gentile left the crew of ER following the fourth season and became a supervising producer and writer on the first season of Providence. Gentile also worked as a consulting producer and writer for the first and second seasons of Third Watch. He was a producer for the short-lived medical drama Dr. Vegas and wrote two episodes for that series.

Gentile served as a medical technical advisor for the pilot of House M.D. and has recently completed writing and executive producing a television movie entitled Austin Golden Hour.

Filmography

Writer

Technical advisor

Director

References

External links
 

Living people
American television writers
American male television writers
Emmy Award winners
New York Medical College alumni
Screenwriters from New York (state)
Year of birth missing (living people)